Two on a Vacation (Italian: Pazza di gioia) is a 1940 Italian comedy film directed by Carlo Ludovico Bragaglia and starring Vittorio De Sica, María Denis, and Umberto Melnati. It was a remake of the 1932 German film Two in a Car. It was shot at the Cinecittà Studios in Rome.

The film's sets were designed by Gastone Medin.

Cast
 Vittorio De Sica as Il conte Corrado Valli  
 María Denis as Liliana Casali  
 Umberto Melnati as Aroldo Bianchi  
 Paolo Stoppa as Alvaro Monteiro, il capo reparto della ditta Do-re-mi  
 Enzo Biliotti as Peppino, il maggiordome del conte  
 Rosetta Tofano as Rosetta, la moglie di Peppino  
 Giuseppe Pierozzi as Il principale della ditta Do-re-mi  
 Marcella Melnati as Rosalia  
 Luigi Erminio D'Olivo as Il direttore d'orchestra  
 Olga von Kollar as Giulia  
 Aristide Garbini as Il proprietario della trattoria  
 Renato Malavasi as Un barbiere  
 Alfredo Martinelli as Il signore con la barba rasata a metà

See also
 Two in a Car (1932)
 Companion Wanted (1932)

References

Bibliography 
 James Monaco. The Encyclopedia of Film. Perigee Books, 1991.

External links 
 

1940 comedy films
Italian comedy films
1940 films
1940s Italian-language films
Films directed by Carlo Ludovico Bragaglia
Italian remakes of foreign films
Remakes of German films
Films scored by Giovanni Fusco
Italian black-and-white films
1940s Italian films